The following is a timeline of the history of Djibouti, Djibouti.

Prior to 20th century

 1888 – Port established.
 1892 – Capital of French Somaliland relocated to Djibouti from Obock.
 1897 – Ethiopia relies on the Port of Djibouti as its official maritime outlet.

20th century

 1903 – Dire Dawa-Djibouti railway begins operating.
 1906 – Hamoudi Mosque built.
 1914 – Roman Catholic Diocese of Djibouti established.
 1917
 Addis Ababa-Djibouti railway begins operating.
 Population: 13,608.
 1940 – Population: 26,987.
 1948 – Djiboutian franc (currency) introduced.
 1949 – Free port established.
 1950 – Civil Ambouli aerodrome opens near city.
 1954 – Electric power plant built.
 1963 - Population: 41,217.
 1964 –  consecrated.
 1967
 Radiodiffusion Télévision de Djibouti begins broadcasting.
 City becomes capital of the French Territory of the Afars and the Issas.
 1970 - Population: 62,000 (estimate).
 1977
 8 May: Afars and Issas independence referendum, 1977.
 City becomes capital of the Republic of Djibouti.
 Population: 110,248.
 Central Bank of Djibouti established.
 1981 – Grand Bara road opens.
 1986 – Tadjoura-Djibouti road opens.
 1987 – Balbala becomes part of city.
 1993 – Stade du Ville opens.
 1995 – Population: 383,000.
 1997 – Corrugated Iron Mosque built.
 1999 – Djibouti Telecom headquartered in city.

21st century

 2006 – Kempinski Hotel in business.
 2009 - Population: 475,322.
 2011 – 2011 Djiboutian protests.
 2012 – Abdourahman Mohamed Guelleh becomes mayor.
 2013
 Parliamentary election held, with the ruling Union for the Presidential Majority winning most seats.
 United States military drone base established at airport.
 2014 – Africa Internet Summit held.
 2017 - Addis Ababa–Djibouti Railway begins operating.

See also
 Djibouti city history
 List of localities in Djibouti

References

Bibliography
in English
 

in French
  (+ table of contents)

External links

 

History of Djibouti (city)
Djibouti
Djibouti-related lists
Years in Djibouti
Djibouti City